Pedro Jorge Gonçalves Malheiro (born 21 January 2001) is a Portuguese professional footballer who plays as a right-back or a winger for Boavista.

Playing career
Malheiro is a product of the youth academies of Vilaverdense, Braga, Palmeiras FC, and Boavista. On 22 January 2020, he signed his first professional contract with Boavista. He began his senior career with the reserves of Boavista, before moving to Vilaverdense on loan for the second half of the 2020–12 season. He made his professional debut with Boavista in a 1–0 Taça da Liga win over Marítimo on 25 July 2021.

References

External links
 
 
 FPF Profile

2001 births
Living people
People from Vila Verde
Portuguese footballers
Association football wingers
Boavista F.C. players
Campeonato de Portugal (league) players
Primeira Liga players
Sportspeople from Braga District